Alpine is an unincorporated community in Chattooga County, in the U.S. state of Georgia. The community is located on the northwest side of the Broomtown Valley in northwest Georgia, southeast of Menlo. It is on Georgia Route 337 north of Alpine Creek.

History
The community was named after the Swiss Alps on account of its lofty elevation. A post office called Alpine was established in 1843, and remained in operation until 1900. A Civil War skirmish occurred near the town site in 1863.

References

Unincorporated communities in Chattooga County, Georgia
Unincorporated communities in Georgia (U.S. state)